Thorsten Goldberg born 26 December 1960 in Dinslaken is a German multimedia artist.

Life 

From 1982 to 1991 Thorsten Goldberg studied sculpture at the State Academy of Fine Arts in Stuttgart in the class of Inge Mahn. 
In 1991 he won the first prize of the Forum of Young Art for his photographic work, "Class of 97" with exhibition stations at Kunsthalle Kiel, Kunstverein Mannheim, Kunstmuseum Wolfsburg, Württembergischer Kunstverein Stuttgart and Staatliche Kunsthalle Baden-Baden. 
Along with the screenwriter Wieland Bauder he created the fictional character Thomas Bauer for joint artistic performances. When Thomas Bauer received the scholarship for photography by the Berlin Senate in 1991, he then took part in the art exhibition “Art on a world scale” at the Kunsthalle Kiel in 1993. 
Since 1995 and in addition to photographs and video works Thorsten Goldberg has been creating site-specific works and public art. He realized numerous projects in public space throughout Germany, in Poland, Norway and Canada and taught at various academies. 2003 - 2008 he was Adjunct Professor for Art in Public Space at the Art Academy Linz/AT and 2007 - 2009 Professor (repress.) for arts and media at the Muthesius Art Academy Kiel/Germany.

As a member of different committees and advisory boards he is involved in the election and organisation of competitions for art in public. 
Thorsten Goldberg is Initiator and Co-Publisher of „Public Art Wiki“, a Germany-wide internet archive for art in public space in the German-speaking-area (http://www.publicartwiki.org)
He is also Co-Publisher of „Kunst in der Großsiedlung (art in the large-housing-area) Marzahn-Hellersdorf“ a printed documentation of more than 460 public works and author of several texts on public art.

Thorsten Goldberg lives in Berlin/Germany.

Selected permanent and temporary works
Cities are all in Germany unless otherwise noted.

Works in public collections 
 The city of Gdańsk, Poland
 The Mazovian Centre of Contemporary Art – Elektrownia in Radom, Poland
 The City of Bergen, Norway
 The Land of Berlin
 The German Federal Ministry of Transport, Building and Urban Development
 The German Federal Ministry of Education and Research (BMBF) in Bonn
 The City of Lippstadt
 The City of Heidenheim
 The Charité University Clinicum in Berlin
 The Martin-Gropius-Hospital in Eberswalde
 The Daimler Art Collection in Berlin
 The Art-Museum in Heidenheim
 Herbert-Gerisch Foundation in Neumünster
 The collection Stefan Haupt in Berlin
 The City of Edmonton, Canada

Publications 
 1992 -  Hans-Peter Feldmann, Preface, catalogue: Goldberg, Württembergischer Kunstverein Stuttgart
 1995 - René Hirner, catalogue: schmutz, Goldberg, Bauder, Kunstmuseum Heidenheim
 2002 - Christoph Tannert, means against amnesia, catalogue: Thorsten Goldberg, Münster 
 2002 - Martin Henatsch, moments of fragility, catalogue: Thorsten Goldberg, Münster 
 2002 - Frédéric Bussmann, rock-paper-scissors in: Kunst in der Stadt, Skulpturen in Berlin, edited by H. Dickel, U. Fleckner, Nicolai Verlag, Berlin 
 2004 - Montse Badia, on milk and honey, Thorsten Goldberg's Utopia Station, in catalogue: Werk 04, Heidenheim Sculpture Symposium 
 2007 - Katharina Klara Jung, Milk + Honey +, in catalogue: Show me the way to public sphere, Wiesbaden 2006, ed office for Art and Public, M. Henatsch, Münster and Department of Culture, Wiesbaden, Kerber Verlag
 2008 - René Hirner, The receipts 93-08 in: TIEFENRAUSCH, Volume 2 - rapture of the deep, edited by OK Center for Contemporary Art, Upper Austria 
 2012 - Dr. Martin Henatsch, Eulalia Domanowska, Jadwiga Charzynska, Kristin Danger, Nicole Loeser, catalogue: 54°4MIN., DISTANZ Verlag

External links 
 Homepage of Thorsten Goldberg
 Public Art Wiki
 Art in public space
 Walks through Berlin
 Things are generally different behind closed doors - Montse Badia about T.Goldberg 
 NY ARTS - Transforming Berlin with Thorsten Goldberg
 A workplace shines, Canadian Architect
 53°30’N Edmonton Arts Council

1960 births
German multimedia artists
German sculptors
German male sculptors
German contemporary artists
Living people